Dempwolf is a surname. Notable people with the surname include:

Gertrud Dempwolf (born 1936), German politician
John A. Dempwolf (1848–1926), American architect
Karl Dempwolf (born 1939), German-born American painter